Hechtia pedicellata is a species of plant in the genus Hechtia. This species is endemic to Mexico.

References

pedicellata
Flora of Mexico